Western Pacific may refer to:
Western Pacific Airlines (1994–1998)
The western Pacific Ocean
Western Pacific Railroad (1903–1983)
Western Pacific Railroad (1862–1870)

Western Pacific may also refer to:
British Western Pacific Territories
Naval Forces Western Pacific 
 Western Pacific Airservice

See also
Northwestern Pacific